Abdullah Bughra (died 1934) was a Uighur Emir of the First East Turkestan Republic. He was the younger brother of Muhammad Amin Bughra and older brother of Emir Nur Ahmad Jan Bughra. He commanded Uighur and Kirghiz forces during the Battle of Kashgar (1934) against the Chinese Muslim 36th Division (National Revolutionary Army). The Chinese Muslims were loyal to the Chinese government and wanted to crush the Turkic Muslim Uighurs and Kirghiz in revenge for the Kizil massacre. He also had Afghan bodyguards protecting him. He was killed in 1934 at Yarkand by Chinese Muslim troops under general Ma Zhancang. All of Abdullah's fighters were killed, but his body was never found, which later gave rise to speculations about his fate.

Several sources state that Abdullah's head was cut off after he was killed and sent to Id Kah Mosque to be put on display.

References

External links
The Soviets in Xinjiang (1911-1949) by Mark Dickens

Year of birth missing
1934 deaths
Uyghurs
East Turkestan independence activists
People executed by the Republic of China by decapitation
Young Kashgar Party politicians
Republic of China politicians from Xinjiang
People from Hotan
20th-century executions by China
Executed people from Xinjiang